Log rolling, sometimes called birling, is a sport involving two competitors, each on one end of a free-floating log in a body of water. The athletes battle to stay on the log by sprinting, kicking the log, and using a variety of techniques as they attempt to cause the opponent to fall off.

Log sizes
There are four different sizes of logs currently used in competitions, though there are many other custom sizes used in training. Each log size has a unique number and color associated with it. In the United States, the dimensions of the logs are standardized by the United States Log Rolling Association (USLRA) while CAN-LOG (Canadian Logger Sports Association) standardizes the sizes in Canada.

USLRA professional men sizes

USLRA professional women sizes

USLRA amateur sizes

CAN-LOG sizes 

United States Logrolling Association
The US Log Rolling Association is the national governing body of the sports of log rolling and boom running. It is the first nation member of the International Logrolling Association (ILRA). The Association is responsible for overseeing rules, regulations, and rankings, and also works to grow and promote the sports of Log Rolling and Boomrunning in the United States.

CAN-LOG
Can-Log was established in the late 1960s to promote the sport of logrolling in Canada, set rules and regulations, and allow for the allocation of Canadian Championship events to the participating competitions.

Rules

The match begins when the whistle is blown or "Time in" is called by the head judge and continues until a fall occurs or the time limit expires (The judge may recall a quick whistle if they feel that the rollers did not have equal control.). The first athlete to lose contact with the log with both feet and fall off the log loses the fall. The last athlete to lose contact with the log wins the fall. For all amateur and professional divisions, matches consist of three out of five falls.

Tournaments can either run with a round robin format (each athlete competes in a match against everyone in their division once) or double elimination bracket (a consolation bracket system in which rollers move higher in the competition each time they win a match or fall lower in the competition each time they lose a match).

Competitors
J.R. Salzman is a 10-time world champion professional logroller. In 2006, he suffered a serious limb injury while deployed in the Iraq War.

Jenny Atkinson is a three-time champion in logrolling.

Judy Scheer-Hoeschler, a seven-time world champion, has founded many of the world's most successful logrolling programs and currently teaches logrolling in Minneapolis, Minnesota, USA.

References

External links
 United States Log Rolling Association (USLRA)
 CAN-LOG
 American Birling Association

Individual sports
Lumberjack sports
Water sports competitions